Travia Jones (born 12 July 1995) is a Canadian sprinter. She competed in the women's 400 metres at the 2017 World Championships in Athletics.

References

External links
 
  (archive)
 

1995 births
Living people
Canadian female sprinters
World Athletics Championships athletes for Canada
Place of birth missing (living people)